Raymond Smith may refer to:
Raymond C. Smith (1943–2022), United States Navy rear admiral and SEAL commander
Raymond Smith (cricketer, born 1923) (1923–1984), South African cricketer
Raymond J. Smith (1930–2008), American editor
Raymond Smith (darts player) (born 1979), Australian darts player
Raymond M. Smith (1924–1988), Canadian politician
Raymond Smith (dancer), Canadian ballet dancer and teacher
Raymond Smith (cricketer, born 1935) (1935–2001), English cricketer
Raymond Smith Jr. (born 1961), Member of North Carolina House of Representatives
Ray Smith (cricketer) (1914–1996), English cricketer
Ray Smith (bishop) (born 1936), Anglican bishop in Australia

See also
Ray Smith (disambiguation)